The Spokane Arena was a 4,000-seat multi-purpose arena in Spokane, Washington, United States. It was home to the Spokane Canaries Pacific Coast Hockey Association franchise from 1916 to 1917.  It was built in 1916.

References

Notes

Indoor ice hockey venues in the United States
Sports venues in Spokane, Washington
Defunct indoor arenas in the United States
Demolished sports venues in Washington (state)
1916 establishments in Washington (state)
Sports venues completed in 1916
Indoor arenas in Washington (state)